Fikri El Haj Ali (born 17 November 1985 in Frankfurt am Main) is a German footballer who plays for SV Griesheim Tarik.

Personal life
He also holds Moroccan citizenship.

References

1985 births
Living people
German footballers
German people of Moroccan descent
FSV Frankfurt players
SV Wacker Burghausen players
Borussia Fulda players
FC Rot-Weiß Erfurt players
Association football midfielders
2. Bundesliga players
3. Liga players
Footballers from Frankfurt